Tridium Inc. is an American engineering hardware and software company based in Richmond, Virginia, whose products facilitate and integrate the automation of building and other engineering control systems.

History and ownership
Tridium Inc. was founded in 1995 and, since November 2005 has operated as an independent business entity of Honeywell International Inc.

Products
Tridium's products facilitate  by integrating building automation using open and proprietary communications protocols such as Modbus, Lonworks and BACnet.

Tridium is the developer of Niagara Framework. The Niagara Framework is a universal software infrastructure that allows building controls integrators, HVAC and mechanical contractors to build custom, web-enabled applications for accessing, automating and controlling smart devices real-time via local network or over the Internet.

References

External links
 

Programming tools
American companies established in 1995
Manufacturing companies based in Richmond, Virginia